Urbano Barberini Riario Sforza Colonna di Sciarra  (born 18 September 1961), best known as Urbano Barberini or sometimes Urbano Barberini Sforza, is an Italian actor. He is also a translator, theater producer and artistic director. He is fluent in Italian and French languages and is mostly known for starring or appearing in many horror, fantasy and drama films, including the cult classic Dèmoni (Demons).

His most recognized role in the English-speaking countries was in his work in Dario Argento's film Opera though in the English dubbing, his voice was replaced with another actor's deeper voice. The only DVD that retains his original voice on the English dub is the UK release from Arrow Films.

Filmography

Windsurf - Il vento nelle mani (1984) - Luca Stella
Dario Argento's World of Horror (1985) - Himself
Il diavolo sulle colline (1985)
Dèmoni (1985) - George
La vita di scorta (1986)
Otello (1986) - Cassio
Until Death (1987) aka The Changeling 2 - Marco
Gor (1987) - Tarl Cabot
Opera (1987) - Inspector Alan Santini
Miss Arizona (1988) - Stanley
Outlaw of Gor (1988) - Prof. Tarl Cabot
The Black Cat (1989) - Marc Ravenna
Torrents of Spring (1989) - Baron Von Doenhof
Rouge Venise (1989)
Courage Mountain (1989) - Italian Captain
Strepitosamente... flop (1991) - Massimo
Moses (1996) - Nahbi
Ultimo bersaglio (1996) - Wolf Körmendi
Stella's Favor (1996) - Tommy
Come mi vuoi (1996) - Gaia
The Eighteenth Angel (1997) - Monk
Le complici (1998)
Borderline (1998) - Alex
Milonga (1999) - Person B
Il diario di Matilde Manzoni (2002)
Adored: Diary of a Porn Star (2003) - Federico Soldani
Signora (2004) - Marcello
Nel mio amore (2004) - Fausto
The Fine Art of Love (2005) - Prince
Casino Royale (2006) - Tomelli
Fantasmi al Valle (2012)
Roam Rome Mein (2019)
Diabolik (2021) - Duncan

References

External links
 

1961 births
Living people
Male actors from Rome